FIIG Securities Limited (FIIG) is an investment firm headquartered in Sydney, Australia with regional offices in Melbourne, Brisbane and Perth. The company was founded in 1998 as one of the first firms to provide investors with direct access to fixed income markets, growing to become the largest fixed income specialist in Australia with billions of dollars under-investment. The company focuses on cash, term deposits, short-term money market securities and corporate bonds.

Notes

External links 
Official site

Financial services companies established in 1998
Investment companies of Australia
Australian companies established in 1998
Financial services companies based in Sydney